The Kinner B-5 was a popular five cylinder American radial engine for light general and sport aircraft of the 1930s.

Design and development
The B-5 was a development of the earlier K-5 with slightly greater power and dimensions. The main change was the increase in cylinder bore from 108 mm (4.25 in) to 117 mm (4.625 in) and a corresponding increase in displacement from 372 cu in (6.1 liters ) to 441 cu in (7.2 liters ). One difference the B-5 had from radial engines of other manufacturers was that each individual cylinder had its own camshaft, a system also used by the contemporary Soviet-built, 8.6 litre-displacement Shvetsov M-11 five cylinder radial, while most other radial engine designs used a "cam ring" for the same purpose, connected to every cylinder's valves. The B-5 was a rough running but reliable engine. The B-5 and its derivatives were produced in the thousands, powering many World War II trainer aircraft; its military designation was R-440. The B-5 was followed by the R-5 and R-55.

Applications
Fleet Fawn
Fleet Finch
Kinner Sportster
Kinner Sportwing
Lincoln AP
Monocoupe 125
Redfern DH-2
Ryan PT-22 Recruit
Savoia-Marchetti S.56

Specifications (Kinner B-5)

See also

References

Further reading

External links
 http://www.oldengine.org/members/diesel/Duxford/usaero4.htm

1930s aircraft piston engines
Aircraft air-cooled radial piston engines